Carranza may refer to:

Places

Europe
Carança river in the Pyrenees
Carranza river, a tributary of the Asón (river)
Karrantza, a town in Biscay, northern Spain

North America
Monclova International Airport, also known as Carranza International Airport, in Coahuila, Mexico
Venustiano Carranza, Baja California, Mexico
Venustiano Carranza, Chiapas, Mexico
Venustiano Carranza, Mexico City, Mexico
Venustiano Carranza, Michoacán, Mexico
Carranza, a barrio in Uruca District, San José, Costa Rica

South America
Adolfo E. Carranza, a village in Catamarca, Argentina
Luis Carranza District, a district in La Mar, Peru
Ministro Carranza (Buenos Aires Underground), a line and station on the Buenos Aires Underground, Argentina

Landmarks
Carranza Lighthouse, a lighthouse and landmark in Chile
Carranza Memorial, a monument in Wharton State Forest, New Jersey
, a museum in Mexico City
Estadio Venustiano Carranza, in Morelia, Mexico
Estadio Ramón de Carranza, in Cádiz, Spain
Estadio Francisco Carranza Limón, in Guasave, Mexico
José León de Carranza Bridge, a bridge located in Cádiz, Spain

Other uses
Carranza (surname)
, a soccer team from Madrid, Spain
A fictional tequila tycoon family in the television series Monarca

See also
Carranca, a type of figurehead attached to river craft in Brazil
Venustiano Carranza (disambiguation)